Juana Amanda Seux Ramírez (3 January 1948 – 2 September 2020), better known as Wanda Seux, was a Paraguayan-Mexican vedette, dancer, and actress, who enjoyed a long career in film, television, and theatre in Mexico.

Biography
Wanda Seux was born in Paraguay, but as a child she moved with her family to the Argentine province of Salta. Her family was of Syrian-Lebanese origin. She married at the age of 23 following a family custom.

At age 11, she was invited to participate in a beauty contest for young girls. She began to practice as a model in Orán, province of Salta. She studied and became an English teacher. At the age of 18, she moved to Buenos Aires, where she got a job as a dancer of Arab dances in a restaurant. She went from being a dancer to a half-vedette. She debuted in 1973 with Nélida Lobato and Zulma Faiad in the Teatro Nacional Cervantes in a revue called Escándalos.<ref>[http://www.informador.com.mx/entretenimiento/2009/150583/6/naci-vedette-y-morire-vedette-wanda-seux.htm El Informador: Article about Wanda Seux]</ref> After a while she traveled to Venezuela where she received an invitation to perform a tour in Mexico.

She arrived in Mexico in 1976 as a vedette, but with a different proposal, since her show was Las Vegas style and emulated the shows offered by figures like Shirley MacLaine or Liza Minnelli. It was said that her production cost a total of nine thousand dollars. Her spectacular costumes were made directly from Argentina, with the modistas of the Teatro Nacional. In her first shows, Seux was accompanied by some of the Bluebell Girls of Le Lido of Paris.

Wanda was known as "The Golden Bomb" and was considered the Barbie of the vedettes because of her blonde hair and stylized figure. Her shows included varieties such as knife throwers and fireballs. Seux was the star of the El Capri cabaret at the Regis Hotel in Mexico City. From there she jumped to the Folies Bergère and then, for four years, she was the star of Marrakesh, owned by Televisa.

She debuted in cinema in 1978 in the film El Arracadas, with the singer Vicente Fernández. She acted in other movies within the so-called Mexican sex comedy of the 1970s and 1980s. She debuted in television in 1985 in the telenovela Salón de belleza. Over the next few years, she has appeared regularly on telenovelas and unit programs in Mexico.

In 1999, Seux participated in the theatrical show Las inolvidables de la noche, with the vedettes Rossy Mendoza, Amira Cruzat, Grace Renat and Malú Reyes. In 2009, she appeared at the age of 60 in Playboy magazine. In that same year she created the character Super Wanda, as part of the cast of the TV show La Oreja.

In 2016, Seux, along with other vedettes like Olga Breeskin, Rossy Mendoza, Lyn May and Princesa Yamal, starred in the documentary film Beauties of the Night, by the filmmaker María José Cuevas.

In 2017, Seux co-starred in the stage play Divas por siempre, alongside comedian Shanik Berman, comedian Manuel Valdés and also vedettes Lyn May, Grace Renat and Princesa Yamal.

Personal life
In February 2010, Seux was diagnosed with breast cancer. She required a protocol of chemotherapy, radiotherapy, biological therapy and surgery. In 2012 she was free of the disease.

She was a faithful defender of animals and cared for more than 44 pets at her home.

Seux died on 2 September 2020, at the age of 72. After being diagnosed with breast cancer in 2010, she suffered multiple strokes in the last two years of her life.

Filmography
 1978: El Arracadas  
 1978: La hora del jaguar 
 1979: La Vida Difícil de una Mujer Fácil 1980: A fuego lento 
 1981: El Macho Biónico como una Invitada a la Fiesta 
 1982: La golfa del barrio 
 1983: Chile picante (en el segmento "Los Compadres") 
 1983: Buenas, y con ... movidas 
 1984: Entre ficheras Anda el diablo - La pulquería 3  
 1987: Que buena está mi ahijada   
 1988: Central Camionera  
 1990: El lechero del barrio 
 1990: Objetos Sexuales 
 1997: Masacre nocturna 2009: Paradas continuas 
 2013: Perdona nuestras ofensas (cortometraje)
 2016: Beauties of the Night (documentary)Television
 1977: Variedades de media noche 1985: Salón de Belleza 
 1990: Alcanzar Una Estrella 1991: Alcanzar Una Estrella II 2009: La oreja 
 2010: Muévete 
 2010: Los Sicarios 2010: Atrevete a soñar 2011: Hasta que el dinero nos separeTheatre
 1974: Colitas pintadas, Teatro Nacional de Argentina
 Las inolvidables de la noche, in the Teatro Blanquita 
 2011: Vestida a la orden 2017: Divas por siempre''

References

External links

1948 births
2020 deaths
Mexican vedettes
Mexican film actresses
Mexican television actresses
20th-century Mexican actresses
21st-century Mexican actresses
Mexican people of Syrian descent
Mexican people of Lebanese descent
Paraguayan emigrants to Mexico